

Games released or invented in the 1930s

References 

Games
Games by decade